The Philippine Open Short Track Championships is the national short track speed skating competition in the Philippines. It is organized by the Philippine Skating Union.

The first edition will be held on September 27, 2018 at the SM Megamall Ice Skating Rink in Mandaluyong. The performance of the more than 35 athletes which will compete in the inaugural edition of the championships will be used as basis for the selection of the Philippines' representatives in the 2019 Southeast Asian Games in short track speed skating. 500-meter, 1000-meter, 1,500-meter and relay will be contested for both male and female competitors. India also fielded speed skaters in this edition. Kevin Villanueva dominated the Men Senior Category by winning three gold medals while Kathryn Magno did the same for the Ladies Senior Category also by winning three gold medals.

Results

References

External links

Short track speed skating competitions
Open Short Track Championships
National championships in the Philippines